Artyom Kiryanov (born 12 January 1977, Veliky Novgorod) is a Russian political figure and deputy of the 8th State Duma. In 2006, he was granted a Candidate of Sciences in juridical sciences degree.

In 1997, Kiryanov joined the movement Our Home – Russia. From 1990 to 2006, he worked at the State Duma of the Russian Federation and the Federation Council. In 2009–2013, he was the vice-chairman of the Public Council of the Main Directorate of the Ministry of Internal Affairs of Russia for the Moscow Region. In 2009, he also was appointed head of the Youth Lawyers Union of the Russian Federation. From 2014 to 2021, Kiryanov was a member of the Civic Chamber of the Russian Federation. Since September 2021, he has served as deputy of the 8th State Duma from the Novgorod Oblast constituency.

References

1977 births
Living people
United Russia politicians
21st-century Russian politicians
Eighth convocation members of the State Duma (Russian Federation)
People from Veliky Novgorod
Herzen University alumni